Aphnaeus neavei, Neave's silver spot or Neave's highflier, is a butterfly in the family Lycaenidae. The species was first described by George Thomas Bethune-Baker in 1926 and it is found in north-eastern Kenya. The habitat consists of dry savanna at altitudes below 200 meters.

References

Butterflies described in 1926
Aphnaeus